Richard Townsend (c. 1731 – 12 December 1783) was an Irish politician.

He was the oldest son of Richard Townsend, son of Bryan Townsend, and his second wife Elizabeth Beecher, daughter of Henry Beecher and granddaughter of Thomas Beecher. His younger brother was John Townsend. Townsend served as colonel of the Cork Militia and was appointed High Sheriff of County Cork in 1753. He entered the Irish House of Commons for Cork County in 1759 and represented the constituency until his death in 1783. In 1776, he was also elected for Dingle, however chose not to sit.

In October 1752, he married Elizabeth FitzGerald, daughter of John FitzGerald, 15th Knight of Kerry. They had a daughter and a son Richard Boyle Townsend.

References

1730s births
1783 deaths
Irish MPs 1727–1760
Irish MPs 1761–1768
Irish MPs 1769–1776
Irish MPs 1776–1783
High Sheriffs of County Cork
Members of the Parliament of Ireland (pre-1801) for County Cork constituencies
Members of the Parliament of Ireland (pre-1801) for County Kerry constituencies